Plymouth Fire Station is a historic fire station located at Plymouth, Marshall County, Indiana.  It was built in 1875, and is a two-story, painted brick building with a 59-foot tall bell tower.  It features round-arched pedestrian entrances and bays, parapet with tile coping, and a round window in the bell tower.

It was listed on the National Register of Historic Places in 1981. It is located in the Plymouth Downtown Historic District.

References

See also
East Laporte Street Footbridge
Marshall County Courthouse (Indiana)
Plymouth Downtown Historic District
Plymouth Northside Historic District
Plymouth Southside Historic District
Plymouth Fire Station

Fire stations on the National Register of Historic Places in Indiana
Government buildings completed in 1875
Buildings and structures in Marshall County, Indiana
National Register of Historic Places in Marshall County, Indiana